The Sun Machine is a 1990 song by E-Zee Possee. It samples David Bowie's 1969 song, "Memory of a Free Festival" from his album, Space Oddity. The single peaked on number 62 on the UK Singles Chart.

Critical reception
David Giles from Music Week wrote, "Variations on an obscure David Bowie track, plus the usual bluesy female vocals, house piano and thumping beat — a formula whose time is gradually running out."

Charts

References

1990 singles
1990 songs
E-Zee Possee songs
Songs written by David Bowie
Songs written by Jeremy Healy